Pritika Chowdhry is an Indian-born American artist, curator, and writer. She is known for her work in the socio-political domain.

Pritika is the founder of Partition Anti-Memorial Project and Counter-Memory Project.

Biography
Born in India, Pritika grew up in New Delhi. In 1999, she moved to the United States.

Pritika attended the University of Wisconsin–Madison and graduated with a Bachelor of Science in Art. She continued her study at the University of Wisconsin–Madison and earned a Master of Fine Arts (MFA) in Studio Arts and a Master of Arts (MA) in Visual Culture and Gender Studies.

Between 2009 and 2011, she was a visiting professor and taught at Macalester College and College of Visual Arts.

In 2007, she founded the Partition Anti-Memorial Project. The project consists of nine sub-projects focusing on historical events, including the 1947 Partition of India, 1971 Bangladesh War of Independence, and the 1919 Jallianwala Bagh Massacre. Her work has been exhibited at notable museums and arts galleries such as Queens Museum, Weisman Art Museum, Hunterdon Art Museum, Minnesota Museum of American Art, Sanskriti Museum & Art Gallery, and Islip Art Museum.

Pritika is the current senior curator at the South Asia Institute and is a member of the board of the Woman Made Gallery, Chicago.

Awards and recognition
 2007: David and Edith Sinaiko Frank Graduate Fellowship
 2011: Performing and creative arts fellowship by American Institute of Indian Studies Fellowship

Selected exhibitions
 Local Time, Weisman Art Museum, 2015
 Empty Time, Minnesota Museum of American Art, 2014
 Remembering the Crooked Line, Rohtas 2 Art Gallery, 2012
 Story Time, Islip Art Museum, 2010
 Retellings, Seven Art Gallery, 2010
 Erasing Borders, Queens Museum of Art, 2009
 The Master's Tongues, Woman Made Gallery, 2009

Permanent collections
 American Swedish Institute
 Ukrainian Institute of Modern Art
 Weisman Art Museum

Bibliography
 Chowdhry, Pritika (2007). Visceral Mappings: Transdiasporic Art Practices

References

Living people
American artists
American women curators
American curators
Macalester College faculty
University of Wisconsin–Madison alumni
Year of birth missing (living people)
People from New Delhi